Tamara Tippler (born 9 April 1991) is an Austrian World Cup alpine ski racer, and specializes in the speed events of super-G and downhill. She made her World Cup debut in December 2011 in Lake Louise, Canada, and attained her first World Cup podium in December 2015, a second place in super-G, also at Lake Louise.

World Cup results

Season standings
{| class="wikitable"  style="font-size:95%; text-align:center; border:gray solid 1px; width:40%;"
|- style="background:#369; color:white;"
| rowspan="2" style="width:6%;"|Season
|- style="background:#4180be; color:white;"
| style="width:3%;"|Age
| style="width:5%;"|Overall
| style="width:5%;"|Slalom
| style="width:5%;"|GiantSlalom
| style="width:5%;"|
| style="width:5%;"|Downhill
| style="width:5%;"|Combined
|-
| 2013 ||21|| 111 || — || — || — || — || 36 
|-
| 2014 ||22|| 106 || — || — || — || 45 || — 
|-
| 2015 ||23|| 97 || — || — || 39 || — || — 
|-
| 2016 ||24|| 30 || — || — || 7 || 27 || — 
|-
| 2017 ||25|| 60 || — || — ||45 || 19 || —
|-
| 2018 ||26|| 41 || — || — ||16 || 30 || —
|-
| 2019 ||27|| 26 || — || — ||6 || 17 || —
|-
| 2020 ||28|| 30 || — || — ||18 || 21 || —
|-
| 2021 ||29|| 11 || — || — ||4 || 7 || rowspan="3" 
|-
| 2022 ||30||21||— ||—||7|| 24
|-
| 2023 ||31||39||—||—||19||19|}

Race podiums

 10 podiums – (1 DH, 9 SG); 29 top tens

World Championship results

Olympic results

References

External links
 
 
 Tamara Tippler at Austrian Ski team (ÖSV) official site  Tamara Tippler at Salomon Skis
  ''

1991 births
Living people
Austrian female alpine skiers
Alpine skiers at the 2018 Winter Olympics
Alpine skiers at the 2022 Winter Olympics
Olympic alpine skiers of Austria
People from Liezen District
Sportspeople from Styria
20th-century Austrian women
21st-century Austrian women